Yonder is the second anthology of short stories by American writer Charles Beaumont, published in April 1958.

Stories collected

Reception
Anthony Boucher found the stories in Yonder to have been better chosen than those in Beaumont's first collection, The Hunger and Other Stories; he praised the book as "grotesque, sensitive, funny, horrible -- in short, Beaumontesque, and strongly recommended."

References

External links

1958 short story collections
Fantasy short story collections
American short story collections